The men's volleyball tournament at the 1990 Asian Games was held from September 23 to October 5, 1990 in Beijing, China.

Results

Preliminary round

Pool A

|}

Pool B

|}

Classification 5th–8th

Semifinals

|}

Classification 7th–8th

|}

Classification 5th–6th

|}

Final round

Semifinals

|}

Bronze medal match

|}

Gold medal match

|}

Final standing

References
Men's Results

External links
AVC Official website

Menen's Volleyball